Southend Central railway station is on the London, Tilbury and Southend line and is one of two primary stations serving the city of Southend-on-Sea, Essex. The city's other main station is called  which is the terminus of a branch line off the Great Eastern Main Line. Its three-letter station code is SOC.

The station and all trains serving it are currently operated by c2c.

Description
Southend Central has four platforms:
Platform 1 is a bay platform; trains may terminate at this formerly disused platform if platform 4 is not available for use or when engineering works are taking place between Southend Central and Shoeburyness; it has an operational length for 12-coach trains.
Platform 3 is typically for westbound services to London Fenchurch Street via ; it has an operational length for 14-coach trains.

In 1922 there were two other bay platforms and carriage sidings to the south of platform 4 and a goods shed and goods sidings to the north of platform 1. The bay platforms (5 and 6) were extant in 1981 although the track had been lifted. The area was subsequently redeveloped as a car park.

Facilities at the station include a partially sheltered bicycle storage rack and a car park. The ticket office has two serving positions, one of which is fully accessible, and uses the Tribute ticket issuing system.

Following the successful refurbishment of Benfleet railway station, c2c implemented a similar project at Southend Central. The work cost £460,000 and was jointly funded by c2c and Southend Borough Council. It involved the complete refurbishment of the ticket office and toilets and the construction of a new forecourt on the north side of the station (leading to platform 2) opposite the University of Essex Southend campus, with new steps and handrails on both sides of the canopy, and a new glass roof and lighting over the bicycle parking area. It was completed in 2007 after around four weeks of work.

When the London Underground's District line operated a seasonal non-stop excursion train service between 1910 and 1939 through to the Southend area, Southend Central was the second station to be called at after departing .

There was formerly a through siding, provided with overhead line electrification, to the north of the down (Shoeburyness-bound) line between Southend Central and Southend East. This was still in use in 1969.

Services 

The typical off-peak service frequency is:

 2 tph (trains per hour) westbound to London Fenchurch Street, of which:
2 tph call at all stations via ;
2 tph call at all stations via ;
 2 tph eastbound to  calling at all stations.

References

External links 

Railway stations in Essex
DfT Category C1 stations
Railway stations in Southend-on-Sea
Former London, Tilbury and Southend Railway stations
Railway stations in Great Britain opened in 1856
Railway stations served by c2c
Buildings and structures in Southend-on-Sea